The Murmansk Oblast Duma is the regional parliament of Murmansk Oblast, a federal subject of Russia. It consists of 32 deputies elected for five-year terms.

Elections

2016

2021

Leadership
 (United Russia) - Chairman of the Regional Duma.
Vladimir Vladimirovich Mishchenko (United Russia) - First Deputy Chairman
Natalia Nikolaevna Vedischeva (United Russia) - Deputy Chairman
Vasily Vasilievich Omelchuk (United Russia) - Deputy Chairman

Federation Council representatives
The Duma appoints one of the two representatives from Murmansk Oblast to the Federation Council. The oblast's other representative, was appointed by the oblast's governor on 27 September 2019.

References

Legislatures of the federal subjects of Russia
Politics of Murmansk Oblast